Welcome to Germany may refer to:

 The Passenger – Welcome to Germany, a 1988 German drama film
 Welcome to Germany (2016 film), a German comedy film